The Former Residence of Zhang Shiming, also known as Hall of Yide is located in Nanxun, Huzhou, Zhejiang, China. It was the former residence of Zhang Shiming, grandson of Zhang Songxian.

History
It was built between 1899 and 1905, during the ruling of Guangxu Emperor in late Qing dynasty (1644–1911).

In 2001, it was inscribed to the fifth batch of "Major National Historical and Cultural Sites in Zhejiang" by the State Council of China.

Architecture
It is influenced by the architecture style of Renaissance architecture in the Western Europe and at the same time preserves the basic form of the residential houses in Jiangnan region.

References

Major National Historical and Cultural Sites in Zhejiang
Traditional folk houses in Zhejiang
Buildings and structures in Huzhou
Tourist attractions in Huzhou